Beyond Fried Chicken, Kentucky Fried Miracle or KFC Chicken Nuggets are a type of food product sold by the international fast food chain KFC. In August 2019, El Segundo, California-based Beyond Meat partnered with KFC for a plant-based chicken nugget. It is the first fast-food chain to introduce a plant-based meat after partnering with Beyond Meat.

Product 
The company decided to replace chicken with a plant-based meat-like product. One alternative is pea-protein mixed with soy, rice flour, carrot fiber, yeast extract, vegetable oil, salt, onion and garlic powder. Nuggets and boneless wings are offered. It was released in US with prices ranging from $6 to $12.

History 
KFC launched the plant-based food with the help of Beyond Meat in response to customer requests. 

A KFC restaurant in Atlanta first tested a product called "Beyond Fried Chicken" in 2019. The product sold out in 5 hours, and outsold a week's worth of popcorn chicken sales. A tweet by KFC after the sell out called it a "Kentucky Fried Miracle".

Reaction 
PETA praised KFC's decision and said that "We’re hopeful that KFC’s Beyond Fried Chicken test marks a new era for the company and that when it sees how much consumers value animals’ lives, it will work to make changes in its supply chain as well".

Comparison with traditional chicken nuggets 
Environmental effects

The Beyond Fried Chicken nuggets are reportedly better for the environment than traditional chicken nuggets.

Health effects

The Beyond Fried Chicken nuggets contain somewhat less calories and fat than KFC's traditional chicken nuggets and about the same amount of sodium. Yet, nutritionists say they should still not be regarded as healthy.

References

Food and drink introduced in 2019
KFC
Meat substitutes